Several ships of the Royal Navy have been named HMS Thais:
 , an 18-gun sloop, sold in 1818
 , a 10-gun , that became a Post Office Packet Service packet, sailing out of Falmouth, Cornwall. She foundered with the loss of all hands in 1833.

Royal Navy ship names